Rowles is a surname. Notable people with the surname include:

 Eddie Rowles (born 1951), English football player
 George Rowles (1866-1922), Wales international rugby union player
 Jimmy Rowles (1918-1996), American Jazz pianist
 John Rowles (born 1947), New Zealand singer
 Polly Rowles, American actress
 Richard Rowles (born 1973), Australian boxer
 Ronald Rowles, Australian rugby league footballer